"Talkin' 'bout a Revolution" is the second single from American singer-songwriter Tracy Chapman's self-titled debut album. The politically aware song peaked at  75 in the United States as opposed to its predecessor, "Fast Car" which reached No. 6. It also charted in several other countries, reaching the top 40 in Austria, Belgium, France, the Netherlands, and New Zealand. The song received heavy radio play in Tunisia in 2011 during the Tunisian Revolution. The song has also been used as an unofficial theme for Vermont Senator Bernie Sanders' 2016 presidential campaign, played before speeches at his campaign rallies.

Charts

Certifications

Cover versions
The song was first covered by the group Living Colour, who not only performed the song on occasion on various tours but released a live version in the compilation album What's Your Favorite Color (1995). The German punk band, Ausbruch, recorded their cover version of the song on the album, Auf Alte Zeiten (1994). English punk band Leatherface released their cover version of the song on their EP "Compact and Bijou" in 1992. 

In 1989 there was a cover version from Pliers of Chaka Demus & Pliers and the Firehouse Crew released, it was later re-released as Revolution Sounds 

It was subsequently covered by singer Ben Jelen on the Russell Simmons/Babyface-produced all-star compilation Wake Up Everybody in 2004. This song was also covered by Reel Big Fish on their 2005 album We're Not Happy 'Til You're Not Happy and Chamberlain as a B-side to "Five Year Diary". In 2010, this song was translated into Cree and covered by Art Napoleon on his album Creeland Covers. In February 2011, Israeli band Shmemel covered the song and added a verse inspired by the Arab Spring revolutions, with the new song being given the title "Talking About an Arab Revolution".

Clarence Bekker, of Playing for Change, sang a cover version to commemorate Martin Luther King Jr. Day, 2017.

In 2020 Mauto, Italian singer-songwriter, recorded an acoustic cover with a new text on the same music as the song entitled "La tua rivoluzione" while in 2022 the electric version of the same song was released.

References

Tracy Chapman songs
1988 singles
1988 songs
Elektra Records singles
Reel Big Fish songs
Ska punk songs
Songs about poverty
Songs about revolutions
Songs written by Tracy Chapman